Berthe Emillene Etane Ngolle (born 19 May 1995) is a Cameroonian freestyle wrestler. She is a two-time silver medalist at the African Games. She won one of the bronze medals in the women's 62 kg event at the 2022 Commonwealth Games held in Birmingham, England. She also won the gold medal in her event at the 2022 African Wrestling Championships held in El Jadida, Morocco.

She competed in the women's freestyle 62 kg event at the 2018 Commonwealth Games in Gold Coast, Australia.

In 2019, she represented Cameroon at the African Games and she won the silver medal in the women's freestyle 62 kg event.

In 2021, she competed at the African & Oceania Olympic Qualification Tournament hoping to qualify for the 2020 Summer Olympics in Tokyo, Japan. She finished in 3rd place. She also failed to qualify for the Olympics at the World Olympic Qualification Tournament held in Sofia, Bulgaria.

References

External links 
 

Living people
1995 births
Sportspeople from Yaoundé
Cameroonian female sport wrestlers
Wrestlers at the 2018 Commonwealth Games
Wrestlers at the 2022 Commonwealth Games
Commonwealth Games bronze medallists for Cameroon
Commonwealth Games medallists in wrestling
African Games silver medalists for Cameroon
African Games medalists in wrestling
Competitors at the 2015 African Games
Competitors at the 2019 African Games
African Wrestling Championships medalists
20th-century Cameroonian women
21st-century Cameroonian women
Medallists at the 2022 Commonwealth Games